Joaquim Salarich Baucells (born 2 January 1994) is a Spanish World Cup alpine ski racer and specializes in slalom.

He has competed in two Winter Olympics and five World Championships.

World Cup results

Season standings

Results per discipline

World Championship results

Olympic results

References

External links

1994 births
Spanish male alpine skiers
Olympic alpine skiers of Spain
Alpine skiers at the 2018 Winter Olympics
Alpine skiers at the 2022 Winter Olympics
Living people
21st-century Spanish people